Maybach Music may refer to:

 Maybach Music Group, a U.S. record label founded by Rick Ross

Songs
 "Maybach Music 1" (song) 2008 song by Rick Ross, aka "Maybach Music"
 "Maybach Music 2" (song) 2009 song by Rick Ross
 "Maybach Music 3" (song) 2010 song by Rick Ross
 "Maybach Music IV" (song) 2012 song by Rick Ross
 "Maybach Music V" (song) 2017 song by Rick Ross
 "Maybach Music VI" (song) 2019 song by Rick Ross

See also

 Rick Ross (U.S. rapper) of Maybach Music
 "Maybach" (song), a 2008 single by The Yellow Moon Band
 
 
 
 Maybach (disambiguation)